L'ispettore Giusti is an Italian television series.

Plot

Cast 
Enrico Montesano as Inspector Giusto Giusti
Mietta as   Caterina Foglia
 Paola Saluzzi as   Claudia Sartor
Nicola Arigliano as  Ermanno Giusti
 Sergio Sivori as  Fejim Corcos
 Francesco Casale as   Marco
 Bed Cerchiai as  Nico

See also
List of Italian television series

External links
 

Italian television series
1999 Italian television series debuts
1999 Italian television series endings
1990s Italian television series
Canale 5 original programming